The 2008–09 Dinamo Riga season was the first season of the franchise in the Kontinental Hockey League (KHL). This was also inaugural season for the league. Dinamo Riga played most of their home games in Arena Riga, however some matches were held in other locations. Dinamo Riga were playing in Kharlamov division along with Avangard Omsk, Lokomotiv Yaroslavl, HC Lada Togliatti, HC Sibir Novosibirsk and Amur Khabarovsk.

Pre-season 
As it is the first season for the franchise, Dinamo Riga had to gather their roster from nothing. Most of the team players are members of Latvia national team. First players for the team were announced on April 25. First foreign player to join the team was Czech Filip Novák on June 26. The team roster was completed, when the last two legionaries Duvie Westcott and Mark Hartigan joined the team on July 22.

Dinamo Riga started their pre-season training camp on July 15. The camp continued till July 28 and took place in Liptovský Mikuláš, Slovakia. The first game in franchise history was held on July 25, when Dinamo Riga defeated MHk 32 Liptovský Mikuláš in a shootout after a 1-1 in regular time.

On August 2 Dinamo played their first home game, when they won against Amur Khabarovsk in Riga. Then at the "Inbox.lv hall" in Riga, Dinamo won the Inbox.lv tournament, in which they defeated Dinamo Minsk and Barys Astana. In August the team also participated in the Tampere Cup (Tampere) and the Governor's Cup (Mytishchi).

Results 

 Green background indicates win. (3 points) 
 Red indicates loss. (0 points) 
 Beige background indicates overtime/shootout win. (2 points) 
 White background indicates overtime/shootout loss (1 point).

Regular season 
Dinamo Riga will play 56 games in regular season. The season will begin on September 2, 2008, it is coming to close on February 26, 2008.

Division standings 

as before 25 October 2008

League standings 
as before 25 October 2008

Results 
 Green background indicates win. (3 points) 
 Red indicates loss. (0 points) 
 Beige background indicates overtime/shootout win. (2 points) 
 White background indicates overtime/shootout loss (1 point).

Player stats

Skaters 

Note: GP = Games played; G = Goals; A = Assists; Pts = Points; +/- = Plus/minus; PIM = Penalty minutes

Goaltenders 
Note: GP = Games played; Min = Minutes played; W = Wins; L = Losses; OTW = Overtime/shootout wins; OTL = Overtime/shootout losses; GA = Goals against; SO = Shutouts; Sv% = Save percentage; GAA = Goals against average

Roster

See also 
 2008-09 Kontinental Hockey League season
 Ice hockey in Europe
 Hockey Europe

Minor League affiliates 
 BEL - HK Riga 2000

References 

Dinamo Riga seasons
Riga